Sir Thomas Daniel Courtenay (born 25 February 1937) is an English actor. After studying at the Royal Academy of Dramatic Art, Courtenay achieved prominence in the 1960s with a series of acclaimed film roles, including The Loneliness of the Long Distance Runner (1962)⁠, for which he received the BAFTA Award for Most Promising Newcomer to Leading Film Roles⁠, and Doctor Zhivago (1965), for which he received an Academy Award nomination for Best Supporting Actor. Other notable film roles during this period include Billy Liar (1963), King and Country (1964), for which he was awarded the Volpi Cup for Best Actor at the Venice Film Festival, King Rat (1965), and The Night of the Generals (1967). For his performance in the 1983 film adaptation of the play The Dresser, in which he reprised the role of Norman he originated both on the West End and Broadway, Courtenay won the Golden Globe Award for Best Actor and received Academy and BAFTA Award nominations. More recently, he received critical acclaim for his performance in Andrew Haigh's film 45 Years (2015).

Expressing a preference for stage work, Courtenay elected to focus on performing in the theatre from the mid 1960s onwards. Nonetheless, Courtenay has continued to perform on screen. He has been feted for his work on television also, winning two British Academy Television Awards for his performances in the television film A Rather English Marriage (1998) and the first series of the crime drama Unforgotten (2015). Courtenay was nominated for a Primetime Emmy Award nomination for the miniseries Little Dorrit (2008). As well as his competitive honours, Courtenay has been recognised with an honorary doctorate from the University of Hull and was knighted for his services to cinema and theatre in the 2001 New Year Honours.

Early life
Courtenay was born on 25 February 1937 in Kingston upon Hull, East Riding of Yorkshire, the son of Annie Eliza (née Quest) and Thomas Henry Courtenay, a boat painter in Hull fish docks. He attended Kingston High School and went on to study English at University College London, where he failed his degree. After this he studied drama at the Royal Academy of Dramatic Art (RADA) in London.

Career
Courtenay made his stage debut in 1960 with the Old Vic theatre company at the Lyceum, Edinburgh, before taking over from Albert Finney in the title role of Billy Liar at the Cambridge Theatre in 1961. In 1963, he played that same title role in the film version, directed by John Schlesinger. He said of Albert Finney, "We both have the same problem, overcoming the flat harsh speech of the North."

Courtenay's film debut was in 1962 with Private Potter, directed by Finnish-born director Caspar Wrede, who had first spotted Courtenay while he was still at RADA. This was followed by The Loneliness of the Long Distance Runner, directed by Tony Richardson and Billy Liar, two highly acclaimed films and performances which helped usher in the British New Wave of the early-to-mid-1960s. For these performances Courtenay was awarded the 1962 BAFTA Award for most promising newcomer and the 1963 BAFTA Award for best actor respectively. He also was the first to record the song Mrs. Brown, You've Got a Lovely Daughter, doing so for the TV play The Lads. The song was released by Decca on a 45 rpm record.

For his role as the dedicated revolutionary leader Pasha Antipov in Doctor Zhivago (1965), he was nominated for an Academy Award for Best Supporting Actor, but was bested by Martin Balsam. Among his other well-known films is King & Country, directed by Joseph Losey, where he played opposite Dirk Bogarde; the all-star war film, Operation Crossbow, directed by Michael Anderson (starring George Peppard and Sophia Loren); King Rat, directed by Bryan Forbes and costarring James Fox and George Segal; and The Night of the Generals, directed by Anatole Litvak with Peter O'Toole and Omar Sharif. He provided physical slapstick comedy in the ultimately chilling anti-nuke black comedy "The Day The Fish Came Out" in 1967. In 1969 and 1971, he was in two spy-comedies, Otley (in the title role) along with "Catch Me A Spy" (1970) starring Kirk Douglas and previously, in 1968, he co-starred in a serious film of that genre, A Dandy in Aspic (1968) opposite Laurence Harvey.

Despite being catapulted to fame by the aforementioned films, Courtenay has said that he has not particularly enjoyed film acting; from the mid-1960s he concentrated more on stage work, although in a later Telegraph interview on 4/20/2005, he admitted "I slightly overdid the anti-film thing". In 1968, Courtenay began a long association with Manchester when he played in The Playboy of the Western World for the Century Theatre at Manchester University directed by Michael Elliott. In 1969, Courtenay played Hamlet (John Nettles playing Laertes) for 69 Theatre Company at University Theatre in Manchester, this being the precursor of the Royal Exchange Theatre, which was founded in 1976 where he was to give many performances, firstly under the direction of Casper Wrede. His first roles for the Royal Exchange were as Faulkland in Richard Brinsley Sheridan's The Rivals and the hero of Heinrich von Kleist's The Prince of Homburg. Since then he has played a variety of roles, including in 1999 the leading role in the theatre's production of King Lear, and in 2001 Uncle Vanya.

Courtenay's working relationship with Wrede returned to film when he played the title role in the latter's 1970 production of One Day in the Life of Ivan Denisovich. His best known film role since then was in The Dresser, from Ronald Harwood's play of the same name (in which he also appeared) with Albert Finney. Both Courtenay and Finney received nominations for Best Actor in the 1983 Academy Awards for their roles, losing to Robert Duvall. He played the father of Derek Bentley (Christopher Eccleston) in the 1991 film Let Him Have It. And for an actor known to be cast in good or great films, he surprisingly co-starred in what's been considered one of the worst movies ever, the infamous Leonard Part 6 starring Bill Cosby.

Courtenay's television and radio appearances have been relatively few, but have included She Stoops to Conquer in 1971 on BBC and several Ayckbourn plays. He appeared in I Heard the Owl Call My Name on US television in 1973. In 1994, he starred as Quilp opposite Peter Ustinov in a Disney Channel 'made for television' version of The Old Curiosity Shop. Rather unexpectedly, he had a cameo role as the anthropologist Bronisław Malinowski in the 1995 US TV film Young Indiana Jones and the Treasure of the Peacock's Eye. In 1998 he teamed with Albert Finney again for the acclaimed BBC drama A Rather English Marriage. He played the role of God, opposite Sebastian Graham-Jones, in Ben Steiner's radio play "A Brief Interruption", broadcast on BBC Radio 4 in 2004. In the same year, he played the role of Stanley Laurel in Neil Brand's radio play 'Stan', broadcast on Radio 4. Also for Radio 4, he played the title role in Nick Leather's The Domino Man of Lancashire and Maurice in Richard Lumsden's Man in the Moon, both broadcast in 2007. Courtenay also appeared in the 2008 Christmas special of the BBC show The Royle Family, playing the role of Dave's father, David Sr.

In 2002, based on an idea by Michael Godley, Courtenay compiled a one-man show Pretending To Be Me based on the letters and writings of poet Philip Larkin, which first played at the West Yorkshire Playhouse in Leeds. It later transferred to the Comedy Theatre in the West End in London.<ref>{{cite news| title=Tom Courtenay: Put yourself in Larkin's shoes| url=https://www.independent.co.uk/arts-entertainment/theatre-dance/features/tom-courtenay-put-yourself-in-larkins-shoes-134296.html| date=2 December 2002| work=The Independent| access-date=10 October 2017| quote=He is credited in the programme with its authorship, which makes him cross. "I didn't write it – it ought to say 'devised' or 'compiled by'. A few years ago, the actor Michael Godley sent him a show of his own devising, hoping that he would appear in it; while Courtenay liked the idea, he thought that version too close to a poetry reading.}}</ref>

In 2007, Courtenay appeared in two films: Flood, a disaster epic in which London is overwhelmed by floods, and The Golden Compass, an adaptation of Philip Pullman's novel, playing the part of Farder Coram. In 2008, he appeared in the BBC adaptation of Little Dorrit by Charles Dickens, playing William Dorrit, and the Christmas edition of The Royle Family, playing David (Senior). In March 2011, he joined the cast of Gambit, a film starring fellow RADA alumnus Alan Rickman that began filming in May. The film was released in Great Britain in November 2012. In 2012, he co-starred in Quartet, directed by Dustin Hoffman.

In 2015, he co-starred with Charlotte Rampling in the highly-praised Andrew Haigh film, "45 Years".  Courtenay won international awards for his role as Geoff Mercer, and the film was critically-acclaimed and very well-received internationally as well as in the U.S.

In 2018, he appeared in The Guernsey Literary and Potato Peel Pie Society and King of Thieves.

In 2019, he was a panellist on Harry Hill's Alien Fun Capsule, Season 3 episode 1. For his introduction, after the other 3 guests had been announced Harry expressed surprise that the fourth seat (Courtenay's) was empty. Harry said he knew the guest had set off some time ago, which was followed by a cut to the 1962 film The Loneliness of the Long Distance Runner in which Courtenay's character was running. Courtenay then entered the studio, apparently out of breath and in the same running kit he'd been wearing in the film.

Also in 2019 he voiced the character of Prince Philip in The Queen's Corgi, his first voice role, and also appeared in The Aeronauts starring Felicity Jones and Eddie Redmayne.

Personal life
Courtenay married actress Cheryl Kennedy in 1973. They divorced in 1982. In 1988, he married Isabel Crossley, a stage manager at the Royal Exchange Theatre in Manchester.  They have homes in Manchester and Putney in London.

In 2000, Courtenay's memoir Dear Tom: Letters From Home was published to critical acclaim. It comprises a selection of the letters exchanged between Courtenay and his mother, interspersed with his own recollections of life as a young student actor in London in the early 1960s.

Courtenay is the President of Hull City AFC's Official Supporters' Club.

In 1999, Courtenay was awarded an honorary doctorate by Hull University.

In 2018, he was bestowed the Honorary Freedom of the City of Hull.

Filmography
Film

Television

Stage
His roles include:

 Konstantin Trepylef, The Seagull by Anton Chekhov at the Old Vic, London (1960)
 Poins, Henry IV, Part 1 at the Old Vic (1961)
 Feste, Twelfth Night at the Old Vic (1961)
 Billy Fisher, Billy Liar by Keith Waterhouse at the Cambridge Theatre, London (1961)
 Andri, Andorra by Max Frisch for the National Theatre Company at the Old Vic (1964)
 Trofimov, The Cherry Orchard by Anton Chekhov at the Chichester Festival Theatre (1966)
 Malcolm, Macbeth at the Chichester Festival Theatre (1966)
 Lord Fancourt Babberley, Charley's Aunt by Brandon Thomas for Century Theatre at the University of Manchester Theatre (1967)
 Christy Mahon, The Playboy of the Western World by John Millington Synge for Century Theatre at the University of Manchester Theatre (1968)
 Romeo, Romeo and Juliet for Century Theatre at the University of Manchester Theatre (1968)
 Hamlet for the 69 Theatre Company at the Edinburgh Festival (1968)
 Young Marlow, She Stoops to Conquer by Oliver Goldsmith for the 69 Theatre Company at the University of Manchester Theatre and then at the Garrick Theatre, London (1969)
 Peer Gynt by Henrik Ibsen for the 69 Theatre Company at the University of Manchester Theatre (1970)
 Lord Fancourt Babberley, Charley's Aunt by Brandon Thomas for the 69 Theatre Company at the University of Manchester Theatre and then at the Apollo Theatre, London (1972)
 Leonard, Time and Time Again by Alan Ayckbourn at the Comedy Theatre, London (1972)
 Captain Bluntschli, Arms and the Man for the 69 Theatre Company at ‘the Tent’ in the Royal Exchange, Manchester (1973)
 Norman, The Norman Conquests by Alan Ayckbourn at the Greenwich Theatre and then at the Globe Theatre (1974)
 John Clarke, The Fool by Edward Bond at the Royal Court Theatre (1975)
 Faulkland, The Rivals by Richard Brinsley Sheridan at the Royal Exchange, Manchester (1976)
 The Prince of Homburg by Heinrich von Kleist at the Royal Exchange, Manchester (1976)
 Simon, Otherwise Engaged by Simon Gray at the Plymouth Theatre, New York (1977)
 Malvolio,  Twelfth Night at the Royal Exchange, Manchester (1978)
 Owen, Clouds by Michael Frayn at the Duke of York's Theatre, London (1978)
 Raskolnikov, Crime and Punishment at the Royal Exchange, Manchester (1978)
 Norman, The Dresser by Ronald Harwood at the Royal Exchange, Manchester, then at the Queens Theatre, London (1980). Then at the Brooks Atkinson Theatre, New York (1981)
 Alceste, The Misanthrope by Moliere at the Royal Exchange, Manchester (1981)
 Andy Capp by Alan Price and James Maxwell at the Royal Exchange, Manchester (1982)
 George, Jumpers by Tom Stoppard at the Royal Exchange, Manchester (1984)
 Rookery Nook by Ben Travers at the Shaftesbury Theatre, London (1986)
 The Hypochondriac by Moliere at the Lyric Theatre (Hammersmith) (1987)
 Dealing with Clair by Martin Crimp at the Orange Tree Theatre, Richmond (1988)
 Harpagon, The Miser by Moliere at the Royal Exchange, Manchester (1992)
 Eric Wells, Poison Pen by Ronald Harwood at the Royal Exchange, Manchester (1993)
 Moscow Stations from the novel by Venedict Yerofeyev, one man show at the Traverse Theatre, Edinburgh then toured (1993)
 Uncle Vanya by Anton Chekhov at the Circle in the Square Theatre, New York (1995)
 Serge, 'Art' by Yasmina Reza at Wyndham's Theatre, London (1996)
 King Lear at the Royal Exchange, Manchester at the Royal Exchange, Manchester (1999)
 Uncle Vanya by Anton Chekhov at the Royal Exchange, Manchester (2001)
 Pretending To Be Me, one man show at the West Yorkshire Playhouse, Leeds then toured (2003)

Singles
 Mrs. Brown, You've Got a Lovely Daughter (1963),  Decca F 11729. Originally sung by Courtenay in The Lads'', a British 1963 TV play.

References

External links

 

1937 births
Living people
21st-century English male actors
20th-century English male actors
Actors awarded knighthoods
Alumni of RADA
BAFTA Most Promising Newcomer to Leading Film Roles winners
Best Actor BAFTA Award (television) winners
Best Supporting Actor BAFTA Award (television) winners
Best Drama Actor Golden Globe (film) winners
Critics' Circle Theatre Award winners
English male film actors
English male stage actors
English male television actors
Knights Bachelor
Male actors from Kingston upon Hull
Male actors from Yorkshire
Silver Bear for Best Actor winners
Volpi Cup for Best Actor winners